{{DISPLAYTITLE:C19H23NO3}}
The molecular formula C19H23NO3 (molar mass: 313.39 g/mol) may refer to:

 Oxyfedrine, a vasodilator
 Esreboxetine
 Ethylmorphine
 Mavoglurant
 Reboxetine

Molecular formulas